Helicoverpa hardwicki is a species of moth of the family Noctuidae. It is endemic to the Northern Territory and Western Australia.

Larvae have been reared on Crotalaria crispata and Rhyncosia minima.

External links
 Australian Faunal Directory

Helicoverpa
Moths described in 1999